Palmodes occitanicus is a species of thread-waisted wasp in the family Sphecidae.

The reproduction behaviour of this species (called the "Sphex languedocien" at the time) is described in detail by the French entomologist, Jean-Henri Fabre, in 1879, in a story intended to convince people that animals are not rational. The wasp normally stings and paralyzes an Ephippiger or related orthopteran prey, and brings it back to its burrow; it leaves the prey item near the entrance, enters the burrow, lays an egg, and then drags the prey item into the burrow where the egg can hatch nearby and the wasp larva can feed. If the prey item is moved while the wasp is in the nest, it will exit, become confused, then grab and reposition the prey near the entrance, and re-enter the nest; if the prey is moved again before the wasp re-emerges, it will continue the process indefinitely.

References

External links

Sphecidae
Insects described in 1828
Taxa named by Amédée Louis Michel le Peletier
Taxa named by Jean Guillaume Audinet-Serville